Song Haoyu (born 28 April 2002) is a Chinese footballer currently playing as a right-back for Nantong Zhiyun.

Club career
Song Haoyu would be promoted to the senior team of Nantong Zhiyun for the beginning of the 2021 China League One season. He would go on to make his debut in a league game on 25 April 2021 against Nanjing City in a 1-1 draw. He would go on to establish himself within the team and helped the club gain promotion to the top tier at the end of the 2022 China League One season.

Career statistics
.

References

External links

2002 births
Living people
People from Linyi
Footballers from Shandong
Chinese footballers
Association football defenders
China League One players
Nantong Zhiyun F.C. players